Kaltasy is the name of two rural localities in the Republic of Bashkortostan, Russia:
Kaltasy, Kaltasinsky District, Republic of Bashkortostan, a selo in Kaltasinsky District
Kaltasy, Karaidelsky District, Republic of Bashkortostan, a village in Karaidelsky District